Balwant Singh was a leader of Shiromani Akali Dal. He was deputy chief minister and finance minister of Punjab, India. He was killed by terrorists in July 1990.

Personal life 
Born in 1929,in the village of Saidpur (Kapurthalla), Balwant Singh is a Kamboj. He started his political career as a member of the congress party and after losing his first election succeeded in getting elected in 1962.He later joined the Akali Dal.He has been minister of finance.
His family lives in Chandigarh.He has 1 son and 2 grandchildren.

References

1990 deaths
People from Kapurthala district
State cabinet ministers of Punjab, India
People murdered in Punjab, India
Victims of the insurgency in Punjab
Assassinated Indian politicians
Year of birth missing
Shiromani Akali Dal politicians
Victims of Sikh terrorism